NGC 6167 is an open cluster in the constellation of Norma, viewed from Earth it has an apparent magnitude of 6.7.

References

External links
 

NGC 6167
6167
Ara (constellation)
Norma (constellation)